John Harris Whitmire (born August 13, 1949) is an American attorney and politician who is the longest-serving current member of the Texas State Senate. Since 1983, he has represented District 15, which includes much of northern Houston, Texas. His tenure earns him the title of Dean of the Senate. Previously he was a member of the Texas House of Representatives from 1973 through 1982.  He also served as the Acting Governor of Texas in 1993 as part of the Governor for A Day tradition.

Early life and education 
Whitmire was born in Hillsboro north of Waco, Texas, to James Madison Whitmire, the Hill County clerk, and the former Ruth Marie Harris, a nurse. His parents divorced when he was seven years old, and the family moved several times, facing difficult financial circumstances.

In his early teenage years, he moved to North Houston and attended Waltrip High School. Whitmire attended college at the University of Houston to study political science while paying for his education by working for the Texas State Welfare Department, where he interviewed food stamp recipients for compliance. He is married to Rebecca Dalby.

Texas House of Representatives 
Under pressure from the Federal Courts, the 1971 legislature drew up Texas's first single-member district plan for the House of Representatives. Whitmire's political science professor Richard Murray was the one to inspire him to run for office as he illustrated the newly drawn district lines that encompassed Whitmire's neighborhood. Whitmire won the primary following a runoff election and easily defeated his Republican opponent. His father provided him a $5,000 loan for his campaign funds.

Whitmire served in the Texas House with colleagues Gene Green, Craig Washington and Mickey Leland and eventually finished his undergraduate degree. In his early years, he was not seen as a particularly influential legislator, and he was criticized by Texas Monthly magazine for his low impact. He began his law studies at the Bates College of Law, then passed the bar in 1981 while still serving in the House. He did not graduate, as state law at the time allowed legislators entrance to the bar without a full J.D.

Texas Senate 
In 1982, Senator Jack Ogg vacated his seat to pursue the Attorney General position. Whitmire captured the Senate District 15 seat, taking office in 1983.

Whitmire won reelection to the state Senate in the general election held on November 6, 2018. With 152,728 votes (65.2 percent), he defeated the Republican candidate, Randy Orr, who polled 75,423 (32.2 percent). Another 6,266 votes (2.7 percent) went to the Libertarian choice, Gilberto "Gil" Velasquez, Jr.

Criminal justice 
In 1993, Whitmire was appointed by Lieutenant Governor Bob Bullock as Chair of the Senate Criminal Justice Committee, where he oversaw reforms to the penal code and increased construction of prisons, to generally favorable reception. Whitmire remains the chair as of the Eighty-seventh Texas Legislature.

Freeing the Tulia 13 
Senator Whitmire passed legislation to free the Texans who were imprisoned as a result of the Tulia drug raid. That incident resulted in the conviction of 38 Texans based on the testimony of one individual who has since been indicted and arrested for perjury. The legislation allowed the judge to release the prisoners on bond pending the decision of the Court of Criminal Appeals. On June 10, 2003, the Tulia defendants were freed on bond as provided for in Senator Whitmire's legislation. They were later pardoned by the Governor.

End to special last meals 
Whitmire was angered by convicted murderer's Lawrence Russell Brewer refusal to eat the extensive last meal he ordered prior to his September 21, 2011, execution. Whitmire said that this was Brewer's attempt to "make a mockery out of the process." The senator contacted the Texas Department of Criminal Justice and asked the agency to end the practice of last meal requests or he would get the State Legislature to pass a bill doing so. The agency replied that last meal requests were accommodated "within reason" from food available in the prison kitchen, but it agreed to end the practice immediately at Whitmire's insistence.

AC in prisons 
In 2021, Whitmire stirred controversy by responding to questions about the lack of air conditioning in prisons by saying: “You know, we can talk about this all day, it’s not gonna change. The prisons are hot. They’re uncomfortable. And the real solution is, don’t commit a crime and you stay at home and be cool. We’re not gonna air condition them. One, we don’t want to. Number two, we couldn’t afford it if we wanted to.” Whitmire's quote was featured the following month on a segment on Last Week Tonight with John Oliver criticizing Texas for not air conditioning its prisons, exacerbating medical conditions and even causing the death of some prisoners. Heat has killed numerous prisoners and cost Texas taxpayers million of dollars in wrongful death suits brought by victims' families.

Redistricting 
In 2003, Whitmire was one of the "Texas Eleven", a group of Democrats who fled the state for New Mexico in 2003 in a quorum-busting effort aimed at preventing the passage of redistricting legislation that would have benefited Texas Republicans. He ultimately returned to the legislature, creating a quorum and undoing the efforts of the rest of the Texas Eleven.

Ethics  
During the 1990s, Whitmer was the subject of several controversies related to potential conflicts of interest with clients and employers stemming from his position on the Senate Criminal Justice Committee.

In 1993, weeks after passing a bill benefitting the Houston Firefighters' Relief and Retirement Fund, Whitmer was hired by the Fund as a Washington, D.C. lobbyist. The Fund allowed the contract to expire following public scrutiny. In 1995, Whitmer came under investigation by the Harris County district attorney's office for taking a job with a state agency whose funding he oversaw via the Senate Criminal Justice Committee. The district attorney eventually cleared him of wrongdoing. Whitmer also came under criticism from watchdog groups and colleagues for hiring a friend as a consultant to the Criminal Justice Committee.

Election history 

Whitmire won re-nomination to Senate District 15 in the Democratic primary election held on March 4, 2014. He defeated his intraparty challenger, Damian LaCroix, 9,756 (75.1 percent) to 3,232 votes (24.9 percent).

Previous elections

2022

2018

2014

2012

2010

2006

2002

2000

1996

1994

1992

References

External links 

 Profile at the Texas Senate
 Campaign website
Project Vote Smart - Senator John Whitmire (TX) profile
Follow the Money - John Whitmire
2006 2004 2002 2000 campaign contributions

Archived Texas Senate Profile

|-

1949 births
21st-century American politicians
Baptists from Texas
Democratic Party members of the Texas House of Representatives
Democratic Party Texas state senators
Living people
People from Hillsboro, Texas
People from Houston
People from Whitney, Texas
University of Houston Law Center alumni